Amblytropidia is a genus of slant-faced grasshoppers in the family Acrididae. There are about 14 described species in Amblytropidia.

Species
These 14 species belong to the genus Amblytropidia:

 Amblytropidia australis Bruner, 1904
 Amblytropidia chapadensis Rehn, 1906
 Amblytropidia corumbae Bruner, 1911
 Amblytropidia elongata Bruner, 1904
 Amblytropidia ferruginosa Stål, 1873
 Amblytropidia geniculata Bruner, 1911
 Amblytropidia hispaniolana Perez-Gelabert, Dominici, Hierro & Otte, 1995
 Amblytropidia interior Bruner, 1911
 Amblytropidia minor Bruner, 1911
 Amblytropidia mysteca (Saussure, 1861) (brown winter grasshopper)
 Amblytropidia robusta Bruner, 1906
 Amblytropidia sola Rehn, 1939
 Amblytropidia trinitatis Bruner, 1904
 Amblytropidia vittata Giglio-Tos, 1894

References

Further reading

External links

 

Gomphocerinae
Articles created by Qbugbot